Dinner is a 2002 play by the British dramatist Moira Buffini. It premiered at the Royal National Theatre, London on 18 October 2002.

Productions

Original Production 

It was first performed at the Royal National Theatre in 2002, with the following cast:

Harriet Walter - Paige
Nicholas Farrell - Lars
Penny Downie - Wynne
Adrian Rawlins - Hal
Catherine McCormack - Siân
Paul Rattray - Mike
Christopher Ettridge - The Waiter

The director was Fiona Buffini, and the designer was Rachel Blues.

It was revived at Wyndham's Theatre in December 2003, with Adrian Lukis as Hal, Flora Montgomery as Siân, Paul Kaye as Mike and Paul Sirr as The Waiter; all other parts were played by the original cast.

Synopsis

Paige Janssen invites some friends over to dinner to mark the publication of a book, Beyond Belief, written by her husband, Lars. A succession of unusual courses, interrupted by the arrival of an unexpected guest, lead to some surprising revelations and, eventually, to death.

See also
Moira Buffini

References

External links
Review by Terry Finnegan
Script of the Play at Amazon.UK
Curtain Up Review
British Theatre Guide Review
Official Homepage of Original Production at the NT

2002 plays
Plays by Moira Buffini